The Prigmore House is a historic house at 1104 West Fifth Avenue in Pine Bluff, Arkansas.  It is a two-story wood-frame structure, with a gable roof, weatherboard siding, and a high brick foundation.  A single-story gabled ell extends to the rear.  A single-story porch extends across the front facade, supported by grouped columns.  The house was built about 1873 by George Prigmore, a veteran of the American Civil War, and is a rare surviving property in Pine Bluff from that period.

The house was listed on the National Register of Historic Places in 1986.

See also
National Register of Historic Places listings in Jefferson County, Arkansas

References

Houses completed in 1873
Houses in Pine Bluff, Arkansas
Houses on the National Register of Historic Places in Arkansas
National Register of Historic Places in Pine Bluff, Arkansas